Ryan Anderson (born May 2, 1995) is an American football punter who is currently a free agent. He played college football at Rutgers.

College career 
During his sole season as a graduate transfer with Rutgers, Anderson set the Scarlet Knights all-time single-season punting average record, was a Ray Guy Award watch list and first-team All-Big Ten.

- First Team All Big-Ten Punter at Rutgers University (First in school history)                   

- Single Season Punting Average Record Holder at Rutgers University

- Edelman-Fields Big Ten Punter of the Year

- 2x CoSiDA First Team Academic All-American including First Team Academic All-American of the Year in 2016 - 4.0 G.P.A.

- 2x AFCA First Team All-American Punter

- NCAA DIII National Record Holder for Punting Average in a season

- #1 Overall Punter in Olivet College Football History (Since 1884)

Professional career 
Anderson went undrafted in the 2018 NFL Draft, and participated in a rookie minicamp with the New England Patriots, but no deal was reached and Anderson sat out the 2018 season.

Birmingham Iron 
Anderson earned a roster spot with the Birmingham Iron of the now defunct Alliance of American Football, but was replaced with a different punter who had ties to the coaching staff.

New York Giants 
Anderson signed with New York Giants after a tryout at their rookie minicamp on May 5, 2019. He was waived on August 14, 2019.

References 

1995 births
Living people
Players of American football from Michigan
Saginaw Valley State Cardinals football players
Olivet Comets football players
Rutgers Scarlet Knights football players
New York Giants players